Invisible City is a Brazilian fantasy streaming television series created by Carlos Saldanha. It is based on a story co-developed by the screenwriters and best-selling authors Raphael Draccon and Carolina Munhóz. It stars Marco Pigossi as Eric, an environmental police officer who uncovers a hidden world of mythological entities from Brazilian folklore, as he searches for a connection between his wife's death and the mysterious appearance of a dead pink river dolphin on a beach in Rio de Janeiro.

The series premiered on Netflix on February 5, 2021. On March 2, 2021, almost a month after the first season was released, Netflix renewed the series for a second season.

Plot summary 
After finding a dead freshwater pink dolphin on a beach in Rio de Janeiro, detective Eric (Marco Pigossi) of the Environmental Police becomes involved in a murder investigation and discovers a world inhabited by mythical entities usually unnoticed by humans. As he investigates mysterious deaths that mirror that of his own wife, Gabriela (Julia Konrad), it leads him into a community of entities with magical powers. He eventually learns that he himself is a half-entity, and the river dolphin spirit Manaus (Victor Sparapane), whom he found dead as the story began, was his father.

Eric and his newfound compatriots learn that Dry Body, the escaped spirit of a dead, vanished anti-environmentalist evildoer, has possessed his daughter, Luna (Manu Dieguez). Dry Body is killing forest entities out of revenge, and is responsible for Gabriela's death. Seeking a stronger host, Dry Body transfers from Luna to Eric and attempts to resume his killing spree. But Eric sacrifices his own life, killing Dry Body, before the evil spirit can kill anyone else. In the final scene, Eric is mysteriously revived; and as the other entities carry him into the forest, it is implied he has been reborn as a full entity.

Cast and characters

Main 
 Marco Pigossi as Eric: An environmental detective who discovers the dead body of a pink dolphin and gets involved in finding that there is a connection to the murder of his wife.
 Alessandra Negrini as Inês / Cuca: The leader of the entities, a witch whose magical powers include being able to enter the minds of others and make them sleep by singing her self-named song.
 Fábio Lago as Iberê / Curupira: A homeless person who is actually an entity that guards and protects Brazilian forests, perceived by his backward feet, flaming head, and high whistles.
 Jessica Córes as Camila / Iara: An entity in the form of a beautiful mermaid who, with her singing voice, lures men to the waters to drown them.
 Jimmy London as Tutu / Tapire-iauara: An entity working for Inês who is capable of becoming a peccary or tapir.
 Wesley Guimarães as Isac / Saci: A one-legged mischievous entity who disappears and reappears at will.
 Áurea Maranhão as Márcia: Eric's investigative partner in the Environmental Police.
 Julia Konrad as Gabriela: Eric's wife and Luna's mother, whose death triggers the series' events.
 Thaia Perez as Januária: Eric's grandmother and Luna's great-grandmother.
 Manu Dieguez as Luna: Eric and Gabriela's young daughter.
 José Dumont as Ciço: A mysterious man living in the Cedar Forest who is aware to the existence of entities.

Recurring 
 Victor Sparapane as Manaus / Pink Dolphin: A seductive and captivating entity  capable of transforming into a pink dolphin.
 Tainá Medina as Fabiana: João's pregnant ex-fiancée.
 Samuel de Assis as João: Fabiana's controlling ex-fiancé, who also happens to be Ciço's son.
 Rafael Sieg as Ivo: The head of the Environmental Police.
 Rubens Caribé as Afonso: The owner of a construction company that owns the Cedar Forest property, who is also the grandson of Antunes.
 Eduardo Chagas as Antunes / Dry Body: Afonso's grandfather and former owner of the Cedar Forest who, after being killed by Curupira, becomes an entity in the form of a vengeful, rotten spirit.
 Kauã Rodriguez as Baqueta: A street orphan who befriends Isac.

Episodes

Reception 
Invisible City received mixed to positive reviews. Netflix do not release the audience and review numbers. Nevertheless, according to What's on Netflix, Invisible City was the most popular TV show on Netflix in Brazil, and ranked top 10 in France, New Zealand and Spain on February 13, 2021. As stated by FlixPatrol, the TV show was placed among the top 10 most popular series in 12 countries on the same day.

See also 
 Brazilian mythology

References

External links 
 
 

2021 Brazilian television series debuts
Brazilian drama television series
Brazilian mystery television series
Portuguese-language Netflix original programming
Television shows filmed in São Paulo (state)
Brazilian folklore
Television series based on mythology